Ilfenesh Hadera (born December 1, 1985) is an American actress.

Early life
Hadera was born on December 1, 1985 in Harlem. She is of mixed Ethiopian and White American descent. Her father, Asfaha, is a Tigrayan refugee and founder of the African Services Committee, a Harlem based NGO which works with African immigrants. Her mother, Kim Nichols, is a Co-Executive Director of ASC, and Hadera volunteered with the group prior to her acting career. Hadera also worked as a waitress for 10 years prior to her television debut.

She attended The Harlem School of the Arts, followed by the Fiorello H. LaGuardia High School. Hadera went on to receive an MFA in Text and Performance studies from RADA/King's College London.

Career
In 2010 Hadera made her acting debut in the film 1/20.

A frequent collaborator with Spike Lee, she has appeared in Da Brick, The Blacklist, Oldboy, Show Me a Hero, Chi-Raq, Chicago Fire, The Punisher, and She's Gotta Have It.

Hadera co-starred as Stephanie Holden in the 2017 film Baywatch, and in 2018 starred as Kay Daniels in the TV series Deception. She had a recurring role in the Showtime Series Billions, as a secretary to billionaire fund manager Bobby Axelrod, played by Damian Lewis.

On September 29, 2019, Hadera began starring as Mayme Johnson, the wife of Bumpy Johnson in the premiere of the American crime drama television series, Godfather of Harlem on Epix.

Filmography

Film

Television

References

External links

American people of Ethiopian descent
American film actresses
American television actresses
African-American actresses
Living people
1985 births
21st-century American women